Go for It is the fifth album by American R&B group Shalamar, released in 1981 on the SOLAR label.  The album features the 'classic' Shalamar line-up (Jeffrey Daniel, Howard Hewett and Jody Watley).

Daniel has confirmed that Go For It and Friends were recorded at the same time.  For distribution purposes, SOLAR was in the process of leaving RCA Records and joining Elektra Records, but still owed a final Shalamar album to RCA: Go for It was that album, while Friends became the first to be delivered to WEA.  Go for It received indifferent promotion from RCA, and the garish cover-art was also the subject of negative comment.  Only one single ("Sweeter as the Days Go By") was issued, and the album peaked at #18 on the R&B chart and #115 on the Billboard chart.

In 2002, Go for It was re-released by Sanctuary Records in the United Kingdom in a Double CD package with Friends.

Track listing

Personnel

Shalamar
Jeffrey Daniel - lead & backing vocals
Howard Hewett -  lead & backing vocals
Jody Watley - lead & backing vocals

Musical Personnel
Bass – Jeffrey Daniel, Ernest Biles, James Davis, Leon Sylvers III
Cello – Christine Ermacoff, Edgar Lustgarten, Harry Shlutz, Marie Fera
Clavinet – Kevin Spencer, William Shelby
Congas – Greg "Popeye" Dawkins
Drums – Freeman Brown, Gerald Thompson, Wardell Potts
Fender Rhodes electric piano – Kossi Gardner, William Shelby
Guitar – Ernest Reed, Fred Rheimert, Steve Shockley
Keyboards – "Gip" Nobels, Gene Dozier, Joey Gallo, John Barnes, Kevin Spencer, Kossi Gardner, Ron Artists, William Shelby
Organ – Kossi Gardner
Percussion – Fred Lewis, Greg "Popeye" Dawkins, Leon Sylvers III
Violin – Brian Leanord, David Johnson, Jerry Vinci, Ilkka Talvi, Irma Newman, Norman Carr, Norman Leonard, Reginald Hill, Ronald Fulsom, Sheldon Sanou

Charts

Album

Single

References

External links
 Shalamar-Go For It at Discogs

Shalamar albums
1981 albums
SOLAR Records albums
Albums produced by Leon Sylvers III